The 1983 Grand Prix motorcycle racing season was the 35th F.I.M. Road racing World Championship season.

Season summary
The 1983 battle for 500 cc supremacy between Honda's Freddie Spencer and Yamaha's Kenny Roberts would be one of the most dramatic seasons since the 1967 duel between Giacomo Agostini and Mike Hailwood. As was the case in 1967, the battle for the 500 cc crown would pit a former world champion riding a powerful but, ill-handling four cylinder motorcycle against a young upstart riding a less powerful but better handling three cylinder motorcycle. Also as in 1967, the title chase wouldn't be decided until the final race of the season.

1983 would be the last year for the 50cc class as it would be upgraded to 80cc for the 1984 season. Stefan Dörflinger would take the honor of being the last 50cc World Champion. Angel Nieto won the 125 cc crown in dominating fashion, making it his 12th world championship. Carlos Lavado would capture his first 250 cc world championship in a season that saw eight riders share wins over eleven races, Lavado being the only competitor to win more than once. Eighteen-year-old British rider, Alan Carter, created excitement by winning the 250cc French Grand Prix in only his second world championship race, becoming the youngest winner of a 250cc Grand Prix race. Despite the auspicious start to his career, it would be Carter's only Grand Prix victory.

The departure of Kawasaki from the 500cc class left the remaining three Japanese factories to contend for the premier division. Suzuki returned with defending champion, Franco Uncini, Loris Reggiani and Randy Mamola aboard a new version of the RG500 which featured a square tube, welded aluminium frame. The Honda team of Freddie Spencer, Marco Lucchinelli and Takazumi Katayama was made even stronger with the addition of British rider, Ron Haslam, all competing on the three-cylinder NS500. Honda also introduced a production version of the NS500 called the RS500 for privateer racers. These were very similar to the NS500 machines used by the factory racing team but, lacked the special exhaust system. Yamaha team manager Giacomo Agostini had been unable to agree on a contract with rider Graeme Crosby, so AMA Superbike champion Eddie Lawson was brought in as Kenny Roberts' new teammate, both competing with the OW70 YZR500 with a V4 engine. Before the season began, Roberts announced that the 1983 season would be his final year in Grand Prix competition. Cagiva continued to campaign bikes ridden by Jon Ekerold and Virginio Ferrari.

Uncini's title defense was hampered as Suzuki experienced development problems with their chassis which left the team struggling to post good results. Suzuki's pursuit of a lightweight and compact machine had led to a myriad of handling problems associated with the flexing of the thin aluminum frame tubing. Roberts began the season with his YZR500 having problems with overheating and rear suspension, while Spencer started strongly, winning the first three races and five out of the first seven. Roberts was leading the second race in France, when his Yamaha split an expansion chamber causing it to lose power as Spencer won, with Roberts falling to fourth place. The French Grand Prix was marred by the deaths of Japanese rider Iwao Ishikawa during practice after colliding with Reggiani, while Swiss rider, Michel Frutschi, died from injuries sustained during the 500cc race. In Round 3 at Monza, Roberts crashed while leading Spencer three laps from the finish. Roberts came back to win the German Grand Prix, but then finished second to Spencer in Spain in a race Spencer called one of the toughest of his career.

Things began to go Roberts' way at the Austrian Grand Prix as Roberts won while Spencer's Honda suffered a crankshaft failure. In the Yugoslavian Grand Prix, Roberts' Yamaha failed to start immediately, while Spencer charged to an early lead, leaving Roberts to fight through the field to finish in fourth place. Roberts then went on a three-race winning streak with victories in the Netherlands, Belgium and England, while Spencer stayed close with a third place and two second-place finishes. Uncini was injured in an accident at the Dutch TT when he crashed while exiting a curve, then was struck in the helmet by Wayne Gardner's motorcycle as he tried to run off the track. The injury left Uncini in a coma, from which he recovered, but which forced him to sit out the remainder of the season.

The British Grand Prix gave Kenny Roberts a third victory in a row, after a race split in two stages following the deaths of Swiss rider Peter Huber and Northern Irish rider Norman Brown during lap 6 of the first stage. The race was subsequently stopped following some confusion over whether the race had been suspended or not. The event was then decided by aggregate times over the two stages, with Roberts leading both stages of the race, taking victory with Freddie Spencer in second.

The championship then moved to the penultimate round at the Swedish Grand Prix with Spencer holding a two-point lead over Roberts. Roberts led Spencer going into the last lap of the race. Heading down the back straight, Spencer placed his Honda right behind Roberts' Yamaha as they reached the penultimate corner, a ninety degree right-hander. As both riders applied their brakes, Spencer came out of Roberts' slipstream and managed to get inside of the Yamaha. As they exited the corner, both riders ran wide off the track and into the dirt. Spencer was able to get back on the track and back on the power first, crossing the finish line just ahead of Roberts for a crucial victory. Roberts considered Spencer's pass to be foolish and dangerous, and exchanged angry words with him on the podium.

Roberts would have to win the final round at the San Marino Grand Prix with Spencer finishing no better than third place in order for Roberts to win his fourth world championship. In a fitting end to a successful career, Roberts won his last-ever Grand Prix race, however Spencer was able to secure second place to claim the world championship. The two riders dominated the season with each claiming six victories and six pole positions in the 12 race series.

1983 Grand Prix season calendar
The following Grands Prix were scheduled to take place in 1983:

†† = Saturday race

Calendar changes
 The Argentine Grand Prix was taken off the calendar due to the high costs to host the event.
 The South African Grand Prix was added to the calendar.
 The French Grand Prix moved from the Nogaro circuit to the Bugatti Circuit in Le Mans after a strike by all the factory teams, as well as some private drivers, due to the very dangerous track conditions.
 The Nations Grand Prix moved from the Circuito Internazionale Santa Monica to the Autodromo Nazionale Monza.
 The German Grand Prix was moved forward, from 26 September to 8 May.
 The Austrian Grand Prix was moved back, from 2 to 29 May.
 The Yugoslavian Grand Prix was moved forward, from 18 July to 12 June.
 The Finnish and Czechoslovak Grand Prix were taken off the calendar due to dangerous track conditions.
 The San Marino Grand Prix moved from the Autodromo Internazionale del Mugello to the Autodromo Dino Ferrari.

Calendar and Results

1983 Grand Prix season results

Participants and Standings

500cc participants

Notes

 * Frutschi was killed at the second round of the season, the French GP.
 ** Paci was killed during a motorcycle endurance race in Imola.

250cc participants

Notes

 * The 250cc did not participate in round 12 of the championship, the San Marino GP.

500cc riders' standings

Scoring system
Points are awarded to the top ten finishers. A rider has to finish the race to earn points.
 

{|
|

† denotes the death of a rider

250cc standings

125cc standings

† denotes the death of a rider

50cc standings

References
 Büla, Maurice & Schertenleib, Jean-Claude (2001). Continental Circus 1949–2000. Chronosports S.A.

Footnotes

Grand Prix motorcycle racing seasons
Grand Prix motorcycle racing season